The 1990 Cork Intermediate Hurling Championship was the 81st staging of the Cork Intermediate Hurling Championship since its establishment by the Cork County Board in 1909. The draw for the opening round fixtures took place on 17 December 1989. The championship began on 27 May 1990 and ended on 23 September 1990.

On 23 September 1990, St. Finbarr's won the championship following a 1-08 to 0-10 defeat of Tracton in the final at Páirc Uí Chaoimh. This was their first ever championship title.

Mallow's Ronan Sheehan was the championship's top scorer with 0-37.

Results

First round

Second round

Quarter-finals

Semi-finals

Final

Championship statistics

Top scorers

Overall

In a single game

References

Cork Intermediate Hurling Championship
Cork Intermediate Hurling Championship